All Nepal Democratic Youth Association (abbreviated अनेजयु संघ, anejayu sangh) is a political youth movement in Nepal, the youth wing of Rastriya Janamorcha. Kashinath Pokhrel is the president of the organisation.

References

Youth wings of political parties in Nepal
Youth wings of communist parties